Skatutakee Mountain is a  monadnock located in Hancock, New Hampshire approximately  east of the city of Keene and  north of Mount Monadnock. The mountain shares a common base with Thumb Mountain,  to the west. Much of the mountain is wooded but open ledges near the summit provide views of the surrounding countryside; vistas include the north face of Mount Monadnock.

The south side of the mountain drains into Jaquith Brook, thence into Nubanusit Brook, the Contoocook River, the Merrimack River, and the Atlantic Ocean. The north side drains into Ferguson Brook, thence the Contoocook River.

The mountain is part of a  "supersanctuary" composed of a number of conservation properties and easements facilitated by the Harris Center for Conservation Education, other non-profit entities, and the state of New Hampshire. The Harris Center maintains several hiking trails on the mountain and an environmental educational center at the mountain's north foot.

References

 Southern New Hampshire Trail Guide (1999). Boston: The Appalachian Mountain Club.
 Harris Center for Conservation Education. Retrieved November 27, 2008.

Mountains of Hillsborough County, New Hampshire
Mountains of New Hampshire
Hancock, New Hampshire
New Hampshire placenames of Native American origin